Distinguished Canadians (originally titled Interview) is a Canadian talk show television series which aired on CBC Television from 1971 to 1972.

Premise
John David Hamilton interviewed guests such as Claude Bissell (academic), Donald Cameron (politician), George Ramsay Cook (historian), Marshall Crowe (Canada Development Corporation), Gratien Gélinas (playwright), Pierre Juneau (CRTC), Georges-Henri Lévesque (priest, sociologist), Wilder Penfield (neurosurgeon), Allison DeForrest Pickett (entomologist), Charlotte Whitton (Ottawa mayor) and John Tuzo Wilson (geoscientist).

Scheduling
This half-hour series, under the original Interview title, was broadcast on Mondays at 10:30 p.m. (Eastern) from 23 August to 20 September 1971 in the first season.

The second-season episodes were aired on Sundays at 2:00 p.m. from 16 April 1972 to 4 June 1972, after which it returned to the Monday 10:30 p.m. time slot until its final broadcast on 21 August 1972. The title changed to Distinguished Canadians as of the 30 April 1972 episode.

References

External links
 

CBC Television original programming
1972 Canadian television series debuts
1972 Canadian television series endings